Lucas Rodrigues da Silva (born 27 August 1999) is a Brazilian professional footballer who plays as a forward for the Portuguese club Mafra on loan from Casa Pia.

Professional career
On 22 August 2018, Rodrigues signed his first professional contract with Moreirense. Rodrigues made his professional debut with Moreirense in a 2-0 Primeira Liga win over Portimonense S.C. on 29 March 2019.

On 30 August 2019 he joined Mafra on loan.

On 16 July 2021, he moved to Casa Pia.

References

External links
 
 ZeroZero Profile

1999 births
Footballers from São Paulo
Living people
Brazilian footballers
Association football forwards
Mirassol Futebol Clube players
Moreirense F.C. players
C.D. Mafra players
Casa Pia A.C. players
Primeira Liga players
Liga Portugal 2 players
Campeonato Brasileiro Série D players
Brazilian expatriate footballers
Brazilian expatriate sportspeople in Portugal
Expatriate footballers in Portugal